The 2012 ASA Kwik-Trip Midwest Tour presented by Echo Outdoor Power Equipment and grandstay.net will be the sixth season of the American Speed Association's Midwest Tour.  The championship will be held over 13 races, beginning May 6 in Oregon, Wisconsin, and ending October 7 in West Salem, Wisconsin.

Schedule and results

References

Asa Midwest Tour
ASA Midwest Tour seasons